Kwon Jin-ah (born July 18, 1997) is a South Korean singer-songwriter and guitarist. She began her music career after winning third place on SBS' K-pop Star 3 in 2014 and subsequently signing to Antenna Music. She debuted in 2016 with the full-length studio album One Strange Night.

Career

2013–2015: K-pop Star 3 and pre-debut activities 

In 2013, Kwon became a contestant on K-pop Star 3 and placed third in the competition. On May 13, 2014, it was announced that she had signed an exclusive contract with Antenna Music. On June 19, she released her first OST, "I Only See You", for the SBS drama You're All Surrounded. Later that year, she featured on the song "She Said" from Yoo Hee-yeol's Da Capo album. In 2015, she and RM from BTS featured in the song "U" on Primary's album, 2.

2016–present: Debut
In July 2015, Antenna Music announced that Kwon's debut album was nearing completion, with an expected release date in September 2015. It was pushed back, however, due to her experiencing an emotional slump at the time.

On July 18, 2016, she released the duet single "For Now" with fellow Antenna signee and K-pop Star 3 finalist Sam Kim.
The pair promoted as a duo, opening for Charlie Puth's concert in Seoul the following month and performing together at the Asia Song Festival in October.

On 19 September 2016, Kwon made her solo debut with the full-length studio album One Strange Night. It featured songwriting and production contributions from You Hee-yeol, Sunwoojunga, Cha Cha Malone, Ra.D, D.ear and Yun Seok-cheol. Kwon wrote lyrics and music for three songs on the album: "Zig Zag", "Smack" and "20"; with "Zig Zag" being completely self-produced and recorded in her bedroom at home. The album's lead single, "The End", debuted at 17 on the Gaon Digital Chart and charted within the top 100 for more than four months.

On March 24, 2022, Antenna released a video introducing Kwon's new single "Pink!" via SNS on the 24th, and announced their comeback on March 31, 2022.

In May 2022, tickets for Kwon's solo concert "The Dreamer" were sold out, which was held from June 3 to 5, 2022.

In October 2022, Kwon released her new digital single "Stupid Love", released on October 13.

In February 2023, the agency announced that Kwon will make a comeback with EP "The Flag" which is scheduled to be released on March 2,and will also hold solo concerts on April 1 and 2.

Discography

Studio albums

Extended plays

Singles

Other charted songs

Soundtrack appearances

Broadcast singles

Other appearances

Filmography

TV series

Web shows

Awards and nominations

Notes

References

External links
 
 Kwon Jin-ah's official website 
 Kwon Jin-ah's official fan cafe

1997 births
Living people
K-pop singers
People from Busan
K-pop Star participants
South Korean women pop singers
South Korean women singer-songwriters
South Korean rhythm and blues singers
South Korean pop guitarists
South Korean rhythm and blues guitarists
Antenna Music artists
21st-century South Korean singers
21st-century South Korean women singers
21st-century guitarists
21st-century women guitarists